Roja Ramani (also known as Chemparathy Shobana) is an Indian actress who predominantly worked in Malayalam and Telugu films. She was a child actor and her debut movie was Bhakta Prahlada (1967) for which she received National Film Award for Best Child Artist. She was popular during the 1970s and early 1980s and haans acted in Malayalam, Telugu, Kannada and Tamil  movies. She worked in 400 films as a dubbing artiste. She is an active member of BlueCross and is involved in several social service activities.

Early life
She was born in Rajahmundry, Andhra Pradesh, India as the only child to her parents. Her father was a journalist with Picture Post. The family relocated to Madras when she was 6 months old.

Career

She had started her career at the age of 7 in 1966 in the title role of Bhaktha Prahaladha in Telugu . It is the first full-length Eastman color feature film which was produced by AVM Productions. It was a blockbuster hit film. She acted in more than 40 films as a child artist and at the age of 13 she acted as a lead in the Malayalam movie Chemparathy which went on to be a record breaking hit and was a trendsetter at the time. The same movie was remade with Roja Ramani in Telugu as Kanne Vayasu' and in Tamil as Paruva Kaalam which also went on to be huge hits.

She has acted in more than 130 films in Telugu, Tamil, Kannada, Malayalam, Hindi and Oriya. She also lent her voice for over 400 films in Telugu and Tamil for all the leading heroines at the time like Suhasini, Meena, Roja, Raadhika, Soundarya, Ramba, Ramya Krishna, Vijaya Shanthi, Shilpa Shetty, Divya Bharathi, Nagma, and Khushbu.

She also won the AP State Television Award, International Children's Film Festival Award, Filmfare Award, International Film Festival- Indian Panorama Award, and Zee Kutumbam Award.

Personal life
She married Chakrapani, a Telugu actor, in 1981, whom she had met acting in Oriya films. He is now producer/director and Head of ETV Oriya channel. They have a son, Tarun, who acted as a lead actor in the 2000 Tollywood film Nuvve Kavali and a daughter Amulya, who holds a degree in psychology, and is an interior designer.

Awards
National Film Award for Best Child Artist for portraying Prahlada in Bhakta Prahlada - 1967

 1972:Filmfare Best Actress Malayalam — Chembarathy

She has won more than 50 awards and rewards for her performances and voice dubbing. Like AP State Govt. NANDI Awards, Kerala State Govt, FilmFare, Cinema Express, Cine Herald, Malayala Manorama, Cine Goers, Madras Film Fans Associaction etc.

She was felicitated in 75 years of Indian Cinema Celebration and also in 100 years Cinema Celebration.

She has been honored in America, by Telugu Fine Arts Community in New Jersey and by Telugu Association in Tampa, Florida for her lifetime achievement and contribution to film industry. She was honored with Santosham Lifetime Achievement Award for her contribution to Tollywood, at 15th Santosham Film Awards

In 2019, she received Santosham Excellence Award at 16th Santosham Film Awards.

Filmography

Malayalam: credited as Shobana

 1971 – Poompaatta – Sumathy
 1971 – Inquilab Sindabad
 1972 – Chembarathy – Santha
 1973 – Chaayam
 1973 – Mazhakkaru – Shantha
 1973 – Darshanam
 1973 – Gayathry
 1973 – Panitheeratha Veedu – Leela
 1974 – Kaamini
 1974 – Bhoogolam Thiriyunnu
 1975 – Mattoru Seetha
 1976 – Amma
 1977 – Sangamam
 1977 – Anantham Paramanantham
 1978 – Puthariyankam
 1979 – Venalil Oru Mazha
 1979 – Maalika Paniyunnavar
 1979 – Yakshipparu
 1979 – Jeevitham Oru Gaanam – Omana
 1979 – Raathrikal Ninakku Vendi
 1980 – Idimuzhakkam – Panchali
 1980 – Agnikshethram – Radha
 1980 – Palattu Kunjikannan
 1980 – Moorkhan – Rajani
 1980 – Rajaneegandhi – Usha
 1980 – Ambala Vilakku – Savithri
 1980 - Pappu - Herself 
 1981 – Raktham
 1981 – Oothikachiya Ponnu – Shalini
 1981 – Sanchari – Sumam
 1981 – Kadathu – Maalu
 1985 – Jeevante Jeevan

Telugu

 1967 – Bhakta Prahalada
 1969 - Sattekalapu Satteya 
 1971 – Ramalayam
 1973 – Kanne Vayasu
 1974 – O Seeta Katha
 1975 – Moguda Pellama
 1975 – Bali Peetam as Sarada's sister
 1976 – Muthyala Pallaki
 1977 – Alu Magalu
 1978 – Lambadolla Ramadasu
 1979 - Driver Ramudu as Meena (NTR's sister)
 1979 – Sommokadidhi Sokokadidhi
 1979 – Punadhirallu
 1986 – Magadheerudu
 1986 – Kashmora
 1991 - Assembly Rowdy as News Reader

Tamil

 1967 – Iru Malargal -  Geetha
 1967 - Bhakta Prahalada
 1968 - En Thambi -  Uma
 1969 - Thulabharam 
 1969 - Shanti Nilayam
 1969 - Kuzhandhai Ullam
 1970 – Ethiroli - Raji
 1970 - Vilayattu Pillai
 1970 – Enga Mama
 1970 - Janaki Sabatham
 1970 - Namma Kuzhanthaigal
 1971 - Babu
 1973 - Anbu Sagodharargal
 1974 - Paruva Kaalam
 1974 – En Magan - Kamala
 1976 – Needhikku Thalaivanangu
 1976 - Janaki Sabatham
 1978 – Vayasu Ponnu - Radhika
 1978 - Vandikaran Magan - Kokila
 1979 - Sigappukkal Mookkuthi
 1979 - Iru Nilavugal - Chellam
 1980 - Deiveega Raagangal
 1980 - Aayiram Vaasal Idhayam - Vijaya
 1982 - Murai Ponnu (1982)
 1982 - Sangili (1982)

Kannada
 1968 – Bedi Bandavalu
 1977 – Kokila
 1978 – Muyyige Muyyi
 1981 – Bhoomige Banda Bhagavantha

Hindi
 1972 Apna Desh as Rajesh Khanna's niece Sharda (uncredited)
 1973 Jaise Ko Taisa as Jeetendra's (Vijay's) sister Munni

Voice artist

References

External links
 

Actresses in Telugu cinema
Actresses from Rajahmundry
Actresses in Tamil cinema
Actresses in Kannada cinema
Indian voice actresses
Year of birth missing (living people)
Living people
Telugu people
Actresses in Malayalam cinema
Indian child actresses
Filmfare Awards South winners
Indian film actresses
20th-century Indian actresses
Actresses in Hindi cinema
Santosham Film Awards winners
Actresses in Telugu television